Brad Boles (born October 16, 1983) is an American politician who has served in the Oklahoma House of Representatives from the 51st district since 2018.

Boles is a member of the Cherokee Nation.

References

1983 births
21st-century American politicians
21st-century Native American politicians
Cherokee Nation state legislators in Oklahoma
Living people
Republican Party members of the Oklahoma House of Representatives